Tingena collitella is a species of moth in the family Oecophoridae. It is endemic to New Zealand and has been observed in Auckland.

Taxonomy
It was described by Francis Walker in 1864 and named Gelechia collitella. In 1884 Edward Meyrick stated he thought this species might be a form of what is now known as T. griseata. In 1926 Alfred Philpott discussed the species under the name Borkhausenia collitella. In 1988 John S. Dugdale assigned this species to the genus Tingena. The holotype specimen, collected in Auckland, is held at the Natural History Museum, London.

Description 
Walker described this species as follows:

Distribution 
This species is endemic to New Zealand and has been observed in Auckland.

References

Oecophoridae
Moths of New Zealand
Moths described in 1864
Endemic fauna of New Zealand
Taxa named by Francis Walker (entomologist)
Endemic moths of New Zealand